Adagio for Strings is a 1936 orchestral work by Samuel Barber.

Variations
 William Orbit's 2000 version of Barber's work from Pieces in a Modern Style, later remixed by Ferry Corsten
 Tiësto's 2004 version of Barber's work, "Adagio for Strings"

See also
 Remo Giazotto's 1958 work, Adagio in G minor for Strings and Organ that is also associated with Tomaso Albinoni
 Lee Jackson's 1994 arrangement of Giazotto's work for the computer game Rise of the Triad